Desmond Richard Finch (born 26 February 1950) is an English former professional footballer who played in the Football League for Mansfield Town.

References

1950 births
Living people
English footballers
Association football goalkeepers
English Football League players
Mansfield Town F.C. players
Worksop Town F.C. players
Boston United F.C. players
Footballers from Worksop